The following is a list of notable present members of the Beefsteak Club (London).

Lord Christopher, CBE (1925)
The Hon Giles St Aubyn, LVO, FRSL (1925)
Correlli Barnett, CBE, FRSL (1927)
Lord Sainsbury of Preston Candover, KG (1927)
Paul Johnson CBE (1928)
Lord Ashburton, KG, KCVO, DL (1928)
The Viscount Norwich, CVO (1929)
Lord Gladwyn (1930)
The Viscount Bridgeman (1930)
Sir David Hardy (1930)
Lord Elton, TD (1930)
Dr Mark Girouard, FSA (1931)
Naim Attallah CBE (1931)
Sir Peter Petrie, 5th Baronet, CMG (1932)
The Viscount Dilhorne (1932)
Lord Lawson of Blaby, PC (1932)
Lord Williams of Elvel, CBE, PC (1933)
Peter Egerton-Warburton (1933)
Laurence Kelly, FRSL (1933)
Gen Lord Ramsbotham, GCB, CBE (1934)
Lord Brooke of Sutton Mandeville, CH, PC (1934)
Professor Michael Rogers, FBA, FSA (1935)
The Earl of Antrim, FRSA (1935)
Esmond Bulmer (1935)
Sir John Guinness, KCB (1935)
Ian Curteis (1935)
Field Marshal Lord Inge, KG, GCB, PC, DL (1935)
Dr John Hemming, CMG (1935)
Lord Howell of Guildford, PC (1936)
David Pryce-Jones, FRSL (1936)
Professor Roger Graef, OBE (1936)
Sir John Boyd, KCMG (1936)
Sir Humphry Wakefield, Bt, FRGS (1936)
Lord Cope of Berkeley, PC (1937)
His Honour Paul Focke, QC (1937)
Anthony Smith, CBE (1938)
The Earl of Arran (1938)
Lord Butler of Brockwell, KG, GCB, CVO, PC (1938)
Lord Rathcavan (1939)
Andrew Knight (1939)
Lord Dykes (1939)
Dr Donald Adamson, JP, FRSL (1939)
Sir Tobias Clarke, Bt (1939)
The Hon Raymond Seitz (1940)
Francis Carnwath, CBE (1940)
Sir William Cash MP (Bill Cash) (1940)
Professor David Watkin, FRIBA, FSA (1941)
Lord Cavendish of Furness, DL, FRSA (1941)
Lord Watson of Richmond, CBE (1941)
Gen Sir Roger Wheeler, GCB, CBE (1941)
Sir Richard Shepherd, MP (1942)
Sir Kieran Prendergast, KCVO, CMG (1942)
Lord Lingfield, DL (1942)
Edward Mortimer, CMG (1943)
The Earl of Stockton (1943)
Lord Goodlad, KCMG, PC (1943)
Lord Davies of Stamford (1944)
Lt-Gen Sir Michael Willcocks, KCB, CVO (1944)
Lord Patten of Barnes, CH, PC (1944)
The Viscount Devonport (1944)
Godfrey Barker (1945)
The Marquess of Lothian, PC, QC, DL (1945)
Nicolas Maclean of Pennycross (1946)
Robin Lane Fox, FRSL (1946)
Christopher Hudson (1946)
Lord Waldegrave of North Hill, PC, (1946)
Sir Timothy Clifford, FRSE (1946)
Sir Ivor Roberts, KCMG (1946)
The Marquess of Salisbury, PC, DL (1946)
David Campbell of Strachur (1948)
Dr John Robinson, FSA (1948)
Professor Gavin Henderson, CBE (1948)
Malcolm Rogers, CBE, FSA (1948)
Jonathan Sumption, Lord Sumption (1948)
The Earl of Carlisle (1949)
MRAF Lord Stirrup, KG, GCB, AFC, (1949)
Professor Anthony Grayling, FRSL (1949)
Dermot Gleeson (1949)
The Earl of Verulam (1951)
Thomas Woodcock, CVO, DL, FSA (1951)
Lord True, CBE (1951)
Stephen Glover (1952)
Lord Malloch-Brown, KCMG, PC (1953)
Sir Peter Bazalgette (1953)
Charles Crawford, CMG (1954)
Lord Northbrook (1954)
Lord Spencer of Alresford (1955)
Charles Moore (1956)
Mark Seligman, FCA (1956)
The Hon James Stourton (1956)
Stephen Fry (1957)
Nicholas Shakespeare, FRSL (1957)
Brooks Newmark, (1958)
The Viscount Mackintosh of Halifax (1958)
Hugo Swire, PC, MP (1959)
Dr Simon Heffer (1960)
Dr Andrew Roberts, FRSL (1963)
Professor Niall Ferguson (1964)
Iain Martin (1971)
Rory Stewart, OBE, FRSL, MP (1973)
James Pembroke (1966)

References

 Debrett's People 
Beefsteak Club (London)